Ernest Edward "Joe" Scott (November 16, 1906 – May 2, 1947) was an American Negro league first baseman in the 1920s and 1930s.

A native of Ohio County, Kentucky, Scott made his Negro leagues debut in 1927 with the Memphis Red Sox. He went on to play for several teams, finishing his career in 1938 with the Indianapolis ABCs. Scott died in Fort Wayne, Indiana in 1947 at age 40.

References

External links
 and Seamheads

1906 births
1947 deaths
Chicago American Giants players
Columbus Blue Birds players
Homestead Grays players
Indianapolis ABCs (1931–1933) players
Indianapolis ABCs (1938) players
Louisville Black Caps players
Louisville White Sox players
Memphis Red Sox players
Philadelphia Stars players
People from Ohio County, Kentucky
20th-century African-American sportspeople